BasketballClub Luleå is a professional basketball club from Luleå, Sweden that competes in the Basketligan. The team has won the Swedish championship 8 times.

History
The club was founded in 1976 as Plannja Basket. From 1996 till 2007 Plannja won 7 Swedish titles, the only season they didn't win it was the 2002–03 season. Until the 2012–2013 season LF Basket played its home games in the Pontushallen, which held a capacity of 3,000. The club then moved to the ARCUS Arena during the 2012–2013 season due to reconstructions. Starting with the 2013–2014 season it has moved back, although the new name of the Pontushallen arena is Luleå Energi Arena.

In 2015, LF Basket changed its name to BC Luleå. In 2017, the club won its eight national championship.

Trophies
Basketligan (8):
 1996–97, 1998–99, 1999–00, 2001–02, 2003–04, 2005–06, 2006–07, 2016–17
 Runner-up: 2009–10, 2017–18

Logos

Players

Current roster

Season by season

References

External links
Official website 
Team profile at Eurobasket.com

Basketball teams in Sweden
Sport in Luleå
1976 establishments in Sweden
Basketball teams established in 1976